Mitsubishi Power Systems Europe (MPSE) is a company that specialises in developing sustainable energy technologies in Europe, Africa and the Middle East. It is headquartered in London and has offices in Leeds, Hamburg, Madrid, Milan, Prague, and Vienna.

History 
The company, a subsidiary of Mitsubishi Heavy Industries Europe, was established on 8 October 2007.

MPSE is - according to its website - focused on bringing together technology and expertise into one division. It, along with its sister companies Mitsubishi Power Systems America and Mitsubishi Power Systems Asia-Pacific, is a part of the Mitsubishi Group of companies.

In April 2009, MPSE acquired Maintenance Partners NV, a Belgium firm that specialised in the maintenance, repair, and reconditioning of electrical equipment.

On 25 February 2010 it was announced that MPSE would fund a research project looking into wind turbine technology.  It would invest more than £100m in offshore wind turbine research in Britain and create up to 200 jobs by 2014. The UK Department of Energy and Climate Change also announced that it was to help fund the project, which it will do with a grant of £30 million.

Then Business Secretary Lord Mandelson was quoted as saying:

"Mitsubishi's investment in wind turbine R&D and the creation of 200 highly skilled jobs is great news for our future plans in low carbon, high technology industries. The UK is now well-placed to manufacture the turbines needed for the next generation of offshore wind farms. We will continue to work with Mitsubishi to secure production in the UK."

David Warren British Ambassador to Japan also said:

"I am delighted by the announcement on R&D and the prototype production of large-scale offshore wind power generators in the UK by MHI and MPSE. I was very impressed with what I saw on my recent visit to a MHI wind power generator factory in Yokohama. For many years MHI has had close connections with British companies in the aero-engine field, and it is very encouraging that MHI is now developing further new projects in the fast-growing UK low-carbon sector."

References

External links 
 Mitsubishi Power Systems Europe 
 Mitsubishi Heavy industries Europe

Companies based in London
Renewable energy companies of the United Kingdom
Mitsubishi Heavy Industries divisions and subsidiaries
Companies based in the City of Westminster